WSHU (1260 AM), is an NPR member  radio station licensed to Westport, Connecticut. It is owned and operated by Sacred Heart University. By day, WSHU is powered at 1,000 watts using a directional antenna. However, at night, to avoid interference with other stations on 1260 AM, it reduces power to nine watts. Programming is also heard on 150-watt FM translator W276DY at 103.1 MHz in Westport.

WSHU primarily features news, talk and informational programming from National Public Radio with local news updates throughout the day.  It holds periodic fundraisers on the air to support the running of the station.  AM 1260 is one of the WSHU news and talk frequencies, which also includes the HD2 digital subchannel of WSHU-FM (91.1 FM) Fairfield, Connecticut, WSTC (1400 AM) Stamford, Connecticut, WSUF (89.9 FM) Greenport, New York and WYBC (1340 AM) New Haven, Connecticut.

History
For its first three decades, the station's call sign was WMMM. It was a daytimer, broadcasting at 1,000 watts by day and required to go off the air at night. Throughout most of its history, WMMM had a full service middle of the road radio format, featuring popular adult music, local news and sports. For many years, it was co-owned with an FM station at 107.9 MHz (now WEBE).

On June 18, 2015, WSHU was granted a Federal Communications Commission (FCC) construction permit to change the community of license to Seymour, move to a different transmitter site, decrease day power to 650 watts and increase night power to 17 watts.  The station did not go through with the new construction and the construction permit is no longer listed on the FCC's website.

Repeaters 

Notes:

References

External links 
 

Sacred Heart University
Fairfield, Connecticut
Mass media in Fairfield County, Connecticut
SHU
NPR member stations
Radio stations established in 1959
1959 establishments in Connecticut